is a Japanese-American singer and model. He is a member of the Japanese boy group Intersection and the Chinese boy group Into1, the latter after placing fourth in the Chinese reality competition program Produce Camp 2021. He made his solo debut in 2018 with the single "Tell Me".

Personal life
Mika Hashizume was born on December 21, 1998, in Hawaii, United States. He lived there for 16 years, he moved to Japan alone after being recruited by a Japanese agency. He attended an international school in Tokyo and created the group Intersection.

Career

2017-2020: Career Beginnings, debut with Intersection and solo debut
In 2017, Mika became a member of the Japanese boy group Intersection. They released their first single in 2017 with "Starting Over" but officially debuted in 2018 with "Heart of Gold".

In December 2018, Mika made his solo debut with the single "Tell Me". On April 11, 2019, he released his second single "Road Trips".

2021-present: Produce Camp 2021 and debut with Into1
Mika and two other members of Intersection took part in the Chinese survival reality program Produce Camp 2021. On the final episode, Mika placed fourth and became a member of the multi-national boy group Into1.

On July 28, 2021, Mika alongside BonBon Girls 303's Curley G sang the original sound track for the Chinese drama series You Are My Glory.

On January 4, 2022 Kappa announced that Mika along with BonBon Girls 303's Curley G will be their Youth Ambassadors.

On July 18, it was announced that Mika will perform at 'Summer Limited Refreshing Music Festival'.

Ambassadorships and endorsements
Alongside Mika's activities with Into1, he has become a brand ambassador and spokesperson for various brands such as Kappa, NARS, Yves Saint Laurent and more. He has also featured on the cover of many magazines such as SuperELLE, Modern Weekly, Schön, Men's Uno, and more  He has also modelled for Louis Vuitton and Bottega Veneta

Discography

Singles

Soundtrack Appearances

Other Songs

Composition Credits

Filmography

Notes

References

1998 births
Living people
Produce 101 (Chinese TV series) contestants
Reality show winners
Into1 members
Intersection (group) members
21st-century American male singers
21st-century American singers
Japanese idols
American expatriates in China
People from Hawaii
Avex Group artists